Keratin 15 is a protein that in humans is encoded by the KRT15 gene. It has also been referred to as cytokeratin 15, K1CO and KRTB. 

Keratin 15 is a type I cytokeratin. It is well-expressed in the basal layer of complex epithelia. However, acral keratinocytes express little to no keratin 15.

References

Further reading 

 
 
 
 
 
 
 
 
 
 
 
 
 
 
 

Keratins